Football Club Sheriff Tiraspol is a Moldovan football club based in Tiraspol, a city located in the unrecognised breakaway state of Transnistria.

History

Sheriff Tiraspol first qualified for European competition in 1999, after finishing fourth in the League, entering in to the 1999–2000 UEFA Cup, where they were knocked out on away goals by Sigma Olomouc after a 1–1 draw at home, and a goalless draw in Olomouc.

2021–22 season 
During the 2021–22 season, Sheriff became the first Moldovan team to qualify for the group stages of the UEFA Champions League after a 3–0 aggregate win over Dinamo Zagreb. They were drawn into Group D to face Inter Milan, Real Madrid and Shakhtar Donetsk. On 15 September, Sheriff won their opening group game, 2–0 against Shakhtar Donetsk, before following it up with an upset 2–1 away victory over Real Madrid at the Santiago Bernabéu on 28 September 2021, with Sébastien Thill scoring the winning goal in the 89th minute.

European matches

Player statistics

Appearances

Goalscorers

Clean sheets

Overall record

By competition

Legend: GF = Goals For. GA = Goals Against. GD = Goal Difference.

By country

By club

Notes

References

External links

Europe
Sheriff